Svend Aage Rye Sørensen (3 August 1926 – 27 September 2002) was an amateur Danish featherweight boxer. He competed in the 1948 Summer Olympics, but was eliminated in the first bout.

References

1926 births
2002 deaths
Boxers at the 1948 Summer Olympics
Olympic boxers of Denmark
Danish male boxers
Featherweight boxers
Sportspeople from Aalborg